Andrew Macleod is an Australian piccolo player. He is the Principal Piccolo of the Melbourne Symphony Orchestra. Together with the Melbourne Symphony Orchestra, Benjamin Northey and Markus Stenz, Macleod was nominated for the 2014 ARIA Award for Best Classical Album for the album Ades Polaris / Stanhope Piccolo Concerto.

Discography

Albums

Awards and nominations

ARIA Music Awards
The ARIA Music Awards are presented annually from 1987 by the Australian Recording Industry Association (ARIA).

! 
|-
| 2014
| Ades Polaris / Stanhope Piccolo Concerto (with Melbourne Symphony Orchestra, Benjamin Northey, Markus Stenz)
| Best Classical Album
| 
| 
|-

References

External links
Andrew Macleod - Melbourne Symphony Orchestra

Australian musicians
Living people
Year of birth missing (living people)